During the southern Ukraine offensive of the 2022 Russian invasion of Ukraine, the city of Odesa and the surrounding region have been the target of shelling and air strikes by Russian forces on multiple occasions since the conflict began, fired predominantly from Russian warships situated offshore in the Black Sea. The city has also been targeted by Russian cruise missiles.

Timeline 

The first Russian airstrikes against Odesa occurred on the first day of the invasion, early on 24 February 2022, targeting warehouses in the city as well as radar and air defense systems in Lipetske. The attacks left at least 22 killed and 6 wounded among servicemen and soldiers. Ukrainian authorities also reported that Russian shelling targeted the military airport in Odesa and destroyed one aircraft. Russian saboteurs had begun operating in Odesa by 27 February, as Ukrainian authorities detained them and confiscated their equipment. Evacuation trains began taking civilians out of the city towards Chernivtsi and Uzhhorod on 2 March, with further evacuation trains operating on 8 March.

At around 12:00 local time on 2 March 2022, Russian forces shelled the village of Dachne to the north-west of Odesa, damaging a natural gas pipeline and setting fire to nine houses and a garage. This was followed on 3 March by the shelling of the nearby villages of Zatoka and Bilenke, killing at least one civilian in the latter village. Russian warships also shelled the Ukrainian civilian vessel Helt in the port of Odesa, causing it to sink.

On 5 March 2022, one Russian Mil Mi-8  of registration number RF-91165 was destroyed near Odesa. A new brigade of the Territorial Defense Forces of Ukraine was founded in Odesa on 8 March, after initial complaints by civilians in the city wishing to join the defence force of a lack of organisation as they were sent home without weapons.

Russian attacks in Odesa intensified towards the end of March. During the morning of 21 March 2022, Russian warships reappeared offshore and began shelling targets in Odesa including the port, before Ukrainian coastal artillery returned fire and drove them back out into the Black Sea. On 25 March, Ukrainian air defences claimed to shot down three cruise missiles over the Black Sea which were on course to strike targets in and around Odesa. Ukraine claimed two more Russian cruise missiles were shot down off the coast of Odesa on 27 March, although the city subsequently came under heavy mortar fire according to a statement on Telegram by Serhii Bratchuk, spokesman for the Odesa military administration.

On 13 April 2022, Ukrainian presidential adviser Oleksiy Arestovych and Odesa governor Maksym Marchenko said that the Russian cruiser Moskva, flagship of the Russian Black Sea Fleet, had been hit by two Neptune anti-ship missiles and was on fire in rough seas. The missiles were apparently launched in or near Odesa at Moskva located 60 to 65 nautical miles offshore. The Russian Ministry of Defence said that a fire had caused munitions to explode, and that the ship had been seriously damaged and the crew fully evacuated, without any reference to a Ukrainian strike. The following day, the ship sunk as it was attempting to reach port for repairs. Russia stated one sailor from the Moskva was killed and 27 were missing, while 396 crewmembers were rescued.
However, according to Ukrainian sources, there were anywhere from 500 to 700 crewmembers on board, and that only 100 of them had survived.

On 23 April 2022, a Russian missile strike hit a military facility and two residential buildings, killing eight civilians and wounding 18 or 20, according to Ukraine. Russia confirmed the attack stating the facility targeted was a logistic terminal at a military airfield that housed US and European weapons given to Ukraine.

On 27 April 2022, Russian forces attacked Zatoka Bridge with the aim of disconnecting the city of Odesa with the rest of the country at the east of Dniester river.

On 1 May 2022, Ukrainian President Zelensky said that Russian forces destroyed the newly built runway of the Odesa Airport. Ukrainian officials said Russian forces used a Bastion missile for the attack. The city was bombed again on 7 May, with four missiles hitting a civilian building and another two on the city airport. On 7 May, a Ukrainian Naval Aviation Mil Mi-14, piloted by Col. Igor Bedzai was shot down near Odesa by a Russian jetfighter after a mission on Snake Island, five servicemen were lost.

On May 9 2022, Russia fired three Kinzhal missiles to Odesa Oblast. At that time, President of the European Council Charles Michel and Prime Minister of Ukraine Denys Shmyhal were in Odesa and had to hide in a bomb shelter. In the evening of the same day, Russian troops fired rockets at three warehouses in Odesa and a shopping centre in the village of Fontanka near the city. One person was killed, and two people were injured in the warehouses, and three people were injured in the mall.

In the night between 30 June and 1 July 2022, three Kh-22 missiles fired from Tu-22M strategic bombers were fired into a 9-store apartment building and an recreational center in the settlement Serhiivka,  Bilhorod-Dnistrovskyi Raion, Odesa Oblast. The whole section of the apartment building was destroyed. At least 21 people were killed and more than 38 wounded.

On 23 July 2022, less than a day after signing a grain export deal with Ukraine, Russia launched Kalibr missiles at the Odesa sea trade port. According to Ukraine, two of the four missiles were intercepted. Russian officials told Turkey that Russia had "nothing to do" with the missile strike. The next day, Igor Konashenkov, a spokesman of the Russian Ministry of Defence, confirmed the strike, claiming that it destroyed a Ukrainian warship and a warehouse of Harpoon anti-ship missiles.

As of July 26, 2022, as a result of rocket attacks in Odesa, eleven civilians were killed: eight (including a three-month-old girl) as a result of an attack on the residential complex "Tiras" on April 23; one teenager during the attack on the dormitory on May 2, one employee of the warehouse during the attack on the Suvorovsky district of Odesa on May 9 and a warehouse guard on June 20.

References 

21st-century mass murder in Ukraine
Odesa
February 2022 events in Ukraine
March 2022 events in Ukraine
April 2022 events in Ukraine
May 2022 events in Ukraine
June 2022 events in Ukraine
July 2022 events in Ukraine
Southern Ukraine campaign
History of Odesa
War crimes during the 2022 Russian invasion of Ukraine
February 2022 crimes in Europe
March 2022 crimes in Europe
April 2022 crimes in Europe
May 2022 crimes in Europe
June 2022 crimes in Europe
July 2022 crimes in Europe
Mass murder in 2022
Airstrikes conducted by Russia
Attacks on buildings and structures in 2022
Attacks on buildings and structures in Ukraine
Russian war crimes in Ukraine